The Rubik's Cube, a 1974 invention of Ernő Rubik of Hungary, fascinated people around the globe and became one of the most popular games in America in the early 1980s, having been initially released as the Magic Cube in Hungary in late 1977, and then re-manufactured and released in the western world as Rubik's Cube in 1980.  As of January 2009, 350 million cubes have been sold worldwide making it the world's top-selling puzzle game. It earned a place as a permanent exhibit in New York’s Museum of Modern Art and entered the Oxford English Dictionary in 1982. The Cube retains a dedicated following, with almost 40,000 entries on YouTube featuring tutorials and video clips of quick solutions.

Film and television
The ability to solve a Rubik's Cube quickly is often used as a way of establishing a character's high intelligence. The films Brick, Armageddon, Dude, Where's My Car?, WALL-E, Little Big Shots, Let the Right One In, The Pursuit of Happyness, Snowden, and the series Seinfeld and The Simpsons include sequences which depict this.
 Characters are frustrated by the Cube in the films UHF, Being John Malkovich, The Wedding Singer, And The Band Played On, Mr. Peabody and Sherman, Spider-Man: Into the Spider-Verse, and [[Hellboy (2004 film)|Hellboy]].
 In the film Night at the Museum: Battle of the Smithsonian (2009), the lead character uses the "Cube of Rubik" as a ruse to deceive and slow the villain's progress.
 The Soviet cartoon "Cube" (rus. Кубик) is a television package film in which the transition from one short film to another takes place under the means of a Rubik's cube.
 Rubik, the Amazing Cube was a short-lived Saturday morning cartoon television series where the main character was a sentient Rubik's Cube.
 In the third season of Law & Order, Detectives Briscoe (Jerry Orbach) and Logan (Chris Noth) arrest a man who is playing with a Rubik's Cube on a bench.
 In the British TV show Law & Order UK, the character James Steel can occasionally be seen trying to solve one and, in addition, one has been seen on his desk.
 In the South Park episode "The Coon" a Rubik's 3x3x3 cube is seen.
 In "Cube Wars", an episode from the television series Whatever Happened to... Robot Jones?, the students play with a changeable 4x4x4 cube called the Wonder Cube which is similar to the Rubik's Revenge.
 The Big Bang Theory features a tissue box that looks like a Rubik's Cube.
 In 2010, commercial Filipino TV network TV5 made their own station ident out of a Rubik's cube.
 A Rubik's Cube can be seen in the Toy Story Toon Partysaurus Rex. It dances along with other toys that have sunk to the bottom of Bonnie's bathtub after a light-up puffer fish toy lands in the bottom of the tub.
 On April 14, 2013 National Geographic aired episode 2, The Revolutionaries, of their documentary series, The 80s: The Decade That Made Us. The Rubik’s Cube featured in a segment of that episode.
 Rubik's Cubes were a feature of the 2014 Eurovision Song Contest, with the postcard introducing the Hungarian entry showing András Kállay-Saunders completing a Rubik's Cube and subsequently creating the Hungarian flag out of several cubes, honouring Ernő Rubik's Hungarian origins.
 The Rubik's Cube is one of the gadgets Balthazar Bratt uses in Despicable Me 3. He uses it as a smoke bomb.
 In the episode "Badge! Gun!" (S1E02) of the TV series Limitless, which first aired in 2015, the protagonist Brian is seen solving two Rubik's cubes at once, each with one hand, thanks to the effects of NZT, a powerful brain-enhancing drug at the center of the series and the related 2011 movie (Limitless).
 Solved, a 2016 short horror film starring world-champion speedcuber Rowe Hessler, portrays an obsession with the Rubik's Cube as its central plot device.
 In 2010, the Creative Artists Agency got the film rights to the toy and are searching from studio to studio to get a movie made.
 In the episode "Welcome Back, Charlotte Richards" (S3E05) of Lucifer, which first aired in 2017, Ella Lopez (the LAPD forensic scientist) is seen playing with an old school Rubik's cube while talking to Daniel Espinoza (the cube is a few turns from being solved).
 In the 2018 film Ready Player One, Wade Watts uses a Rubik's cube called the Zemeckis Cube to reverse the flow of time in his vicinity.
 The 2018 film Spider-Man: Into the Spider-Verse uses the Rubik's Cube as a running gag in which a side character, Spider-Man Noir, travels into the present, where the film is set, and discovers the Rubik's Cube. Spider-Man Noir is fascinated by it even though he can not see color. In the film's post credits scene, he is seen back in the past, selling the Rubik's Cube as an amazing contraption.
 The 2019 film Toy Story 4 shows the scrambled Rubik’s Cubes left by Andy Davis and Bonnie Anderson.

Comics and manga
While the God's Number of a Rubik's Cube has been determined to be 20 by computer algorithms, in DC Comics Final Crisis crossover series, it is shown that a real god can solve it in less (with the actual number being 17). The time-traveling New God Metron is depicted with a cube; and the solving of a cube utilizing a God's Number maneuver of 17 results in a flash of blinding supernatural luminosity which destroys evil minions of Darkseid in the vicinity, as well as restoring the memory of the amnesic New God who just solved it

In the manga and anime of Tonari no Kaibutsu-kun Yoshida Haru is seen to be solving a Rubik's Cube in episode 6. However, it is shown that he has solved the Rubik's Cube.

Museum exhibition
Liberty Science Center and Google designed an interactive exhibit based on the Rubik's Cube. It opened at LSC in Jersey City, NJ, in April 2014 in celebration of the 40th anniversary of the Cube's invention before traveling internationally for 7 years. Exhibition elements include a 35-foot-tall rooftop cube made of lights that people can manipulate with their cellphones, a $2.5 million cube made of diamonds, a giant walk-in cube displaying the inner workings of the puzzle, and cube-solving robots.

Google doodle
To commemorate the 40th anniversary of the cube's invention, Google made an interactive doodle of the cube on May 19, 2014. The doodle allowed users to solve the cube, by twisting and turning its parts, keeping a score of moves on the side.

Music video
The famous cube appears in Spice Girls' "Viva Forever" music video.
The cube also appears in Maroon 5's "Payphone" music video. It can be found (unsolved) on the desk of the banker in the official video. The cube also appears in "If You" music video by the singer Magic Box. A cube is briefly shown being rough-handled (comically, with a screwdriver) by a puppet caricature of Mr. Spock from Star Trek in the Genesis' "Land of Confusion" music video.

Music
In 1981, the British humorous pop group, The Barron Knights released a song called Mr. Rubik which appeared on their album entitled Twisting The Knights Away. The album's cover also depicts a Rubik's Cube which contains the photos of the band members on each smaller cube. The song is about a person who is going crazy after playing a Rubik's Cube.

A promotional Rubik's Cube featuring the four Julian Opie portraits of the band members of Blur was released in 2000 in promotion for the Blur: The Best of album (which also features the portraits on the cover)

Art

Probably from the earliest days of the Rubik's Cube craze in the 1980s people have assembled cubes to form simple art pieces, several early 'Folk Artists' are noted for their work. Rubik’s Cubes have also been the subject of several pop art installations. Owing to their popularity as a children’s toy several artists and groups have created large Rubik’s Cubes.

Tony Rosenthal's Alamo ("The Astor Cube") is a spinnable statue of a Cube standing in New York City. Once the cube was covered with colored panels so that it resembled a Rubik's Cube. Similarly, the University of Michigan students covered Endover creating a large Rubik’s Cube on the University of Michigan’s central campus for April fool’s day in 2008. In conjunction with the 2008 April fool’s day cube covering, a student group created a large rotating non-functional Rubik’s Cube for the University of Michigan's North Campus. Built out of 600+ lbs. of steel, the cube was an entertaining addition to North Campus. Removed later the same semester, the cube reappeared in the fall of 2008 on the first day of classes. It was later removed, but in response to the cube, the university is planning on a permanent Rubik's Cube art installation on North Campus. Oversized Cube installations with staircases in them are found outside the 1980s-themed buildings of Disney's Pop Century Resort.

The largest Rubik's Cube sculpture to date, called Groovik's Cube, is 30 ft tall and was built by a team of artists in Seattle in 2009 for Burning Man. The piece is powered by LED lights and is fully interactive and playable, using electronic control stations.

Rubik's Cubism
Beyond the Folk Art of the 1980s and 1990s, and the simple replication of a Rubik's Cube in oversized form, artists have developed a pointillist art style using the cubes. Rubik's Cube Art a.k.a. Rubik's Cubism or RubikCubism makes use of a standard Rubik’s Cube, a popular puzzle toy of the 1980s.  The earliest simple forms of the art probably occurred with independent “cubers” even in the first years after the cube became popular.

The earliest recorded artworks appear to have been created by Fred Holly, a legally blind man in his 60s in the mid-1980s. These early pieces focus on geometrics and color patterns. There does not appear to be other recorded art pieces until the mid-1990s by cube aficionados involved in the puzzle and game industry.

The Folk art form reached another level of its evolution with the development and maturity into a Pop art form consisting of pointillist Cube Art renderings. The street artist who uses the alias "Invader" or "Space Invader" started exhibiting pointillist pieces, including one of a man behind a desk and Mario Bros, using Rubik's Cube in June 2005 in an exhibition named 'Rubik Cubism' at Sixspace in Los Angeles. Prior to this exhibition the artist had used Rubik's Cubes to create giant Space Invaders. Another artist includes Robbie Mackinnon of Toronto Canada with earliest published work in 2007 who claims to have developed his pointillist Cube Art years earlier while being a teacher in China. Robbie Mackinnon's work has been exhibited in Ripley's Believe it or Not and focussed on using pop-art, while Space Invader has exhibited his Cube Art alongside mosaic Space Invaders in commercial and public galleries.

In 2010 artist Pete Fecteau created "Dream Big", a tribute to Martin Luther King Jr. using 4,242 officially licensed Rubik's Cubes. Fecteau also worked with the organization You Can Do The Rubik's Cube to create two separate guides designed to teach school children how to create Rubik's Cube mosaics from templates which he also created.

Video games
A few video games based on the Rubik's Cube have been made. There have been versions on the Wii in 2009, iOS in 2010, the Nintendo 3DS and Wii U in 2016.

Atari released an unofficial version of the cube for its Atari 2600 system in 1982, under the name Atari Video Cube.

Gadgets and consoles
In 2018, two independent development teams introduced electronic versions of Rubik's Cube. A group from Tel Aviv (Israel) introduced GoCube, a sports gadget plug-in via BlueTooth to the tablet.

Satire

The satirical website The People's Cube lampoons political correctness by selling cubes that are red on all six sides, thereby ensuring equal results for all who attempt to "solve" them.

References

External links
 Tony Rosenthal's Alamo as a Rubik's Cube All too flat

Rubik's Cube
Topics in popular culture
Pop art
Folk art